was a Japanese politician. He held different cabinet posts.

Biography
Miyashita was born in 1927. He worked at the Ministry of Finance as a budget examiner. He was a member of the Liberal Democratic Party and served in the House of Representatives for seven terms. He was appointed director general of the Japan Defense Agency on 5 November 1991, replacing Yukihiko Ikeda in the post. Miyashita served in the post until 12 December 1992 when Toshio Nakayama succeeded him in the post.

He was appointed head of the Environmental Agency to the cabinet led by Prime Minister Tomiichi Murayama on 14 August 1994. Miyashita succeeded Shin Sakurai in the post when the latter resigned from office due to his statements about the role of Japan in World War II. In August 1998, Miyashita was appointed minister of health and welfare to the cabinet headed by Prime Minister Keizō Obuchi. Then Miyashita was made chairman of the Liberal Democratic Party's tax panel.

Miyashita died of pneumonia in Tokyo on 7 October 2013.

References

External links

|-

|-

20th-century Japanese politicians
1927 births
2013 deaths
People from Nagano Prefecture
University of Tokyo alumni
Liberal Democratic Party (Japan) politicians
Members of the House of Representatives (Japan)
Government ministers of Japan
Japanese defense ministers
Grand Cordons of the Order of the Rising Sun